Adrian Dimitri Mascarenhas (born 30 October 1977) is a former English cricketer. A right-handed batsman and right-arm medium-fast bowler, he played internationally for England, as well as domestically for Hampshire. He holds the record for most runs in an over in a One Day International for England, with 30, scored off Yuvraj Singh of India on 5 September 2007. He was the bowling coach for both Otago Volts and the New Zealand national cricket team. He stood down after the 2016 summer for family reasons, which coincided with the retirements of the McCullum Brothers.

Early life
Mascarenhas was born in London to Malik Mascarenhas and his wife, Pauline (née de Croos), both from the Bharatha community of Sri Lanka. He grew up in Perth, Western Australia and attended school at Trinity College, Perth; other alumni include Australian international cricketers Simon Katich, Tim Zoehrer, Beau Casson, and Craig Serjeant. In 1996 Mascarenhas returned to England to pursue a professional cricket career.

Cricket career

Early Cricket
Mascarenhas had great success in Australian junior cricket, captaining Western Australia at Under-17 and Under-19 state level competition.

Domestic career

County Cricket
Returning to England, he played a single Minor Counties Championship fixture for Dorset against Cornwall, taking 7/64 in his only match for the county. During the same season he joined Hampshire, where he continued in excellent form, with 6–88 on debut (the best figures for a Hampshire debutant since Teddy Wynyard made 6–63 in August 1899). He then proceeded to make the first Rose Bowl century against Worcestershire in 2001. In 2004, he was the first player to record a hat-trick in Twenty20 cricket, claiming the wickets of Mark Davis, Mushtaq Ahmed and Jason Lewry of Sussex. He was part of the Hampshire team that won the C&G Trophy in 2005 and to finish runners-up in the Frizzell County Championship. In 2006, it was announced that Mascarenhas would receive a benefit year during the 2007 season as a reward for his excellent all round play for the county.

Following Shane Warne's retirement at the end of the 2007 season, Mascarenhas was made club captain for the 2008 County Championship season. During the 2009 County Championship Mascarenhas missed the first matches of the season while playing in the IPL with the Rajasthan Royals. On his return he led Hampshire to the final of the 2009 Friends Provident Trophy at Lord's, where Hampshire beat local rivals Sussex by 6 wickets.

Prior to the 2010 County Championship, Mascarenhas played for the Rajasthan Royals in the IPL, during which he picked up an ankle injury.  Still injured for the first part of the 2010 English county season, Mascarenhas returned for Hampshire in the Friends Provident t20 against Kent, but during the match the injury flared up once more, therefore ruling him out for the rest of the season.

During the 2013 season he announced, aged 35, that he would be retiring from county cricket at the conclusion of the campaign, bowing out after 18 seasons with Hampshire. In total, he had scored more than 12,000 runs in all formats and taken nearly 900 wickets.

Indian Premier League 
In 2008, Mascarenhas signed for the Rajasthan Royals of the Indian Premier League. Following the ECB's decision to not allow centrally-contracted England players to play in the tournament, Mascarenhas was the only English representative in the tournament's inaugural year.

Mascarenhas returned for 2009 Indian Premier League, once again playing for the Rajasthan Royals. He played five matches taking six wickets.

Mascarenhas once again returned to play for the Royals in the 2010 Indian Premier League, playing two matches against Mumbai Indians and Delhi Daredevils, taking four wickets. Following an ankle injury picked up against the Delhi Daredevils, Mascarenhas was forced to return home from the tournament.

Mascarenhas has been bought by the Kings XI Punjab franchisee for US$100,000 during the auction conducted in January 2011. However he had to be replaced by David Miller on 7 April 2011 since he could not recover from the Achilles tendon injury. He was one of the guest commentators for ITV during the Indian Premier League. He played for Kings XI Punjab in the IPL 2012 season.

Otago Volts
In 20 State Twenty20 and State Shield competitions.  Mascarenhas represented the Otago Volts in the 2009 Champions League Twenty20 after Rajasthan and Hampshire failed to qualify.

Tasmanian Tigers
In 2009, Mascarenhas signed for the Tasmanian Tigers as a replacement for Sri Lankan fast bowler Lasith Malinga in the 2009–10 KFC Twenty20 Big Bash. Due to a knee injury he did not play any matches for the state.

International career
In September 2006, Hampshire's Australian county captain Shane Warne publicly highlighted Mascarenhas' tremendous ability and issued a call for him to be rewarded with selection for the England One Day International (ODI) team. On 13 September 2006 he wrote in The Times: "It amazes me that England have never given him a chance in the one-day side. He is the best finisher with the bat in all situations in the country and his bowling is clever and accurate".

He subsequently made his ODI debut on 1 July 2007 at Lord's against the West Indies, scoring 2 runs and completing 4 overs for 18 runs.
On 5 September 2007, in an ODI against India, he hit consecutive sixes off the final five balls of England's innings, which were bowled by Yuvraj Singh. On 8 September 2007 he took 3/23 off 10 overs as England won the one-day series 4–3, on the same day he was also called up to England's ICC World Twenty20 squad as a replacement for Ryan Sidebottom. During England's one day series in New Zealand, he hit 4 consecutive sixes against New Zealand in a Twenty20 match.

He played a total of 20 ODIs and 14 T20Is for England, scoring a total of 368 runs and taking 25 wickets across both formats.

Geoff Miller – Twitter outburst 
In 2010, Mascarenhas vented his frustration at the chairman of the England selectors, Geoff Miller, claiming to have been ignored by him at a game. He tweeted, calling Geoff Miller a 'knob' and other derogatory terms. He also pointed out that his teammate James Adams hit 194 runs in a match between Lancashire and Hampshire when Miller came to watch and Adams was not considered for the T20s.

Following the Twitter outburst, Mascarenhas was banned for 14 days at the start of the 2011 season. Mascarenhas apologised unreservedly for his actions. He was fined £1000 by Hampshire and £500 by the ECB. The panel considered this to be a serious breach of the regulations, particularly given his status as a senior cricketer and club captain. Mascarenhas also stated that he tweeted this after a night out and his actions were stupid and irresponsible and that he regretted any offence it may have caused and that his tweet didn't reflect his true views on Miller.

Coaching 
He has completed an ECB level-three coaching qualification and held player-coach roles with Hampshire, Rajasthan Royals and Hobart Hurricanes. In June 2015 Mascarenhas was appointed as New Zealand's full-time bowling coach having been head coach of New Zealand domestic side Otago since 2014. He resigned as New Zealand coach in 2016, citing personal reasons.

He was appointed by Middlesex as their specialist head bowling coach for the 2019 and 2020 Vitality t20 Blast competitions.

Personal life
Mascarenhas married Nadine Taylor in February 2011 in Melbourne.

References

External links

1977 births
Living people
English cricketers
Dorset cricketers
Hampshire cricketers
Hampshire cricket captains
Otago cricketers
Wellington cricketers
England One Day International cricketers
England Twenty20 International cricketers
People educated at Trinity College, Perth
Rajasthan Royals cricketers
Punjab Kings cricketers
Bharatha people
Sri Lankan Tamil sportspeople
People from Chiswick
Cricketers from Greater London
English people of Sri Lankan Tamil descent
British Asian cricketers
Hobart Hurricanes cricketers
Rangpur Riders cricketers
Melbourne Stars cricketers
Australian people of Sri Lankan Tamil descent
English cricket coaches